Pseudostixis flavifrons is a species of beetle in the family Cerambycidae. It was described by Aurivillis in 1914, originally under the genus Stixis.

References

Phrissomini
Beetles described in 1914